Tetsuya Kajiwara may refer to 

Tetsuya Kajiwara (drummer), drummer with The Blue Hearts
Tetsuya Kajiwara (Fushigi Yūgi), a character in the manga Fushigi Yūgi